Acceleration in Assen is the sixth and last weekend of Acceleration 2014, a multi-day festival combining top class car and bike racing with live music and other entertainment. The festival is organised by the International Sport Racing Association (ISRA), based in the Netherlands, and will be held six times in 2014, starting 25–27 April in Portimao, Portugal and ending 17–19 October in Assen, Netherlands. The various racing competitions are
Formula Acceleration 1 (FA1),
the MW-V6 Pickup Series,
the Legend SuperCup (LSC),
the European Stock 1000 Series (ACC 1000)
and the European Stock 600 Series (ACC 600). However, for this round the ACC 600 and 1000 classes were replaced by the OW Cup, whose drivers were not eligible to score points for the Acceleration championship.
As for the other classes, every driver entering Acceleration 2014 is eligible for points in the drivers' championship as well as the nations' championship. As for music and entertainment, David Hasselhoff is the host of "Celebrate the 80's and the 90's with The Hoff", a dance party featuring 2 Unlimited, Haddaway, and others. Saturday evenings are filled with performances of international DJs.

FA1 Results

Driver Changes
Nathanaël Berthon drove for China. Italy entered two cars, for Gian Maria Gabbiani and Sergio Campana, who was replaced by Dutchman Jeroen Mul at Team Portugal. The Swede Kevin Kleveros took over from Picho Toledano and Craig Dolby drove for Sweden instead of Felix Rosenqvist. The Netherlands also entered a second car, for Bas Schouten, who previously entered MW-V6. Finally, United Kingdom entered this race with Dani Clos at the wheel.

Free Practice

Qualifying sessions

Qualifying 1:
 #4 – lap time in which track limits were disrespected was cancelled
 #11, #19, #21, #38, #42, #69 – fastest lap time cancelled for disrespecting a yellow flag
Qualifying 2:
 #22 – lap time in which track limits were disrespected was cancelled

Race 1

Race 2

 Race was started behind safety car because of rain

Drivers' Championship Standings after 10 out of 10 Races

Teams' Championship Standings after 10 out of 10 Races

MW-V6 Results

Free Practices

Qualifying sessions

Qualifying 1:
 #12 – fastest lap time cancelled for repeatedly disrespecting track limits
 #19 – laptime in which track limits were disrespected was cancelled
Qualifying 2:
 #12 – fastest lap time cancelled for disrespecting a yellow flag

Race 1

Race 2

Race 3

Drivers' Championship Standings after 18 out of 18 Races

Nations' Championship Standings after 18 out of 18 races

Legend SuperCup Results

Free Practices

Race 1

Race 2

Race 3

Race 4

Drivers' Championship Standings after 24 out of 24 Races

Nations' Championship Standings after 24 out of 24 Races

References

Main source
Raceresults.nu

Other sources

Assen
Acceleration